"That's Okay" is a single by South Korean singer D.O. It was released by SM Entertainment on July 1, 2019, through SM Station Season 3.

Background and release 
"That's Okay" is an R&B pop song featuring a warm acoustic guitar and a minimalist drum beat. The lyrics are about letting go of sad feelings and having hope, in order to achieve happiness.

One June 21, it was reported that D.O. would be releasing a song through SM Station Season 3. On June 26, it was revealed that D.O. participated in writing the lyrics of the song, and that it would be released on the day of his military enlistment, July 1, as a gift for his fans. On June 28, SM released an image teaser for the song.

Music video 
The music video is an animation that shows the story of a man finding comfort in reviving a dying potted cactus following the passing of his pet dog.

Track listing

Charts

Release history

References 

2019 singles
2019 songs
Korean-language songs
SM Entertainment singles